List by Family Name: A - B - C - D - E - F - G - H - I - J - K - M - N - O - R - S - T - U - W - Y - Z

 Jakuren (1139–1202)
 Jien (1155–1225)
 Jinzai Kiyoshi (November 15, 1903 – March 11, 1957)
 Jippensha Ikku (1765–1831)
 Jun Maeda (born 1975)

J